Heineken Jammin' Festival is a large live rock festival in Milan, Italy featuring international and Italian rock acts.

It started in mid-June 1998 at the Imola Autodrome and has attracted attendances of more than 100,000 over the course of the three-day event. For the tenth anniversary of the festival in 2007, the location changed to Mestre, Parco San Giuliano.

Some of the featured acts have included Vasco Rossi, Depeche Mode, R.E.M., Robbie Williams, Thirty Seconds to Mars, Lacuna Coil, Red Hot Chili Peppers, Garbage, Bon Jovi, Metallica, Iron Maiden, Marilyn Manson, Santana, Oasis, Green Day, Pixies, Lenny Kravitz, The Cure, and Chemical Brothers.

2011
Headlining acts: Coldplay, Negramaro, Vasco Rossi, Noemi, Beady Eye, Cesare Cremonini, The Pretty Reckless and others.

2010
Headlining acts: Aerosmith, Thirty Seconds to Mars, Pearl Jam. Green Day's performance was cancelled because of a heavy storm that caused damage to the stage and flooded the area. The band stayed long after to see if they could get out and play for their fans but the local authorities said that it wasn't safe.

2008
Headlining acts were Linkin Park, Sex Pistols, Vasco Rossi and the Police

2007 wind
In the afternoon of 15 June 2007, while Le Mani were playing, a strong downburst hit the park. Six steel towers supporting the PA system collapsed and 25 people were injured, and a young woman was crushed to death. The festival stages and equipment were also damaged, and the organizers were forced to cancel the performances of My Chemical Romance, Linkin Park, The Killers and Pearl Jam. The police took control of the festival area and the festival was cancelled.

References

External links
 Official Site
 2008 Official Site
 2007 Official Site
 2011 Official Bus Service 

Heavy metal festivals in Italy
Rock festivals in Italy
Music festivals established in 1998
1988 establishments in Italy
Festivals in Milan